Vishesh Bhriguvanshi (born 13 November 1991) is an Indian professional basketball player who is the captain of the Indian National Basketball Team, and most recently, a player with the Adelaide 36ers of the National Basketball League (NBL). Bhriguvanshi was awarded the Arjuna Award by Govt. of India for the year 2020.

Bhriguvanshi also has a biography by Nirupma Baghley, titled Vishesh: Code To Win, about him being India’s youngest captain.

Early life

Bhriguvanshi was born and brought up in Uttar Pradesh. His father was a lecturer and mother a principal in a Govt. College. As a 12-year-old, Vishesh would follow his brother, Vibhor, to the basketball courts of Udai Pratap College in Varanasi. His career began with participation in the Varanasi U-13 district meet. Bhriguvanshi has represented his district and state and at the age of 17, he was recruited to the Senior Indian men's team.

Professional career
Bhriguvanshi began playing competitive basketball in 2009 at the Asian Club Championships. In 2017, Bhriguvanshi averaged 30.8 points, 9.5 rebounds and 8.2 assists in 11 games for Bengaluru Beast in the United Basketball Alliance of India Pro Basketball League. In one match against rival Hyderabad, he poured in 57 points and registered 11 assists.

On 7 July 2017, Bhriguvanshi signed a one-year training deal with the Adelaide 36ers of the Australian National Basketball League, becoming the league's first Indian player. He did not appear in a game for the 36ers during the 2017–18 NBL season.

He is the first Indian to be signed by Australia's National Basketball League (NBL) in 2017.

National team career
Bhriguvanshi made his debut for the India national basketball team in 2009 at the FIBA Asia Championship. He has since competed at the 2011 FIBA Asia Championship, 2013 FIBA Asia Championship, 2014 FIBA Asia Cup, 2015 FIBA Asia Championship, and 2016 FIBA Asia Challenge. At the 2016 FIBA Asia Challenge in Iran, Bhriguvanshi averaged a career-best 16.9 points per game, to go with 4.4 rebounds, 3.8 assists and 2.5 steals in eight games.

Championship
Bhriguvanshi has helped India to win a 3x3 basketball gold medal at the Asian Beach Games in 2008 and has since been playing in every major FIBA Asia Championship and representing India.

He has won three national champions domestically with Indian Railways and, in 2011, was appointed by Oil and Natural Gas Corporation as its Brand ambassador.

References

External links
 Vishesh Bhriguvanshi's profile

1991 births
Living people
Basketball players at the 2010 Asian Games
Basketball players at the 2014 Asian Games
Basketball players from Varanasi
Indian expatriates in Australia
Indian men's basketball players
Shooting guards
Small forwards
Young Cagers players
Asian Games competitors for India
Recipients of the Arjuna Award
South Asian Games gold medalists for India
South Asian Games silver medalists for India
South Asian Games medalists in basketball